Great Songs of Christmas was Bobby Vinton's thirty-sixth studio album and third Christmas album. The first five songs are newly recorded Christmas songs that were produced by Michael Lloyd, while the last five were taken from Vinton's second Christmas album Santa Must Be Polish.

Track listing
 "God Rest Ye Merry Gentlemen" - (Traditional; arranged by Michael Lloyd and John D'Andrea) - 3:07
 "O Little Town of Bethlehem" - (Traditional; arranged by Michael Lloyd and John D'Andrea) - 2:54
 "Silver Bells" - (Ray Evans, Jay Livingston) - 2:32
 "It Came Upon a Midnight Clear" - (Traditional; arranged by Michael Lloyd and John D'Andrea) - 3:39
 "Christmas in My Home Town" - (Sonny James, John Skye) - 3:04
 "Santa Must Be Polish" - (Bobby Vinton, Margie Cuthbertson) - 2:43
 "Jingle Bells" - (arranged by Bobby Vinton) - 2:41
 "Deck the Halls" - (arranged by Bobby Vinton) - 3:03
 "Santa Claus Is Coming to Town" - (J. Fred Coots, Haven Gillespie) - 2:45
 "Silent Night" - (arranged by Bobby Vinton) - 3:38

[Noted Error:  Track 5 should be titled "Christmas Eve in My Home Town" - (Stan Zabka, Donald Upton) - 3:04]

Album credits
Tracks 1 to 5, produced by Michael Lloyd
Tracks 1 to 5, arranged by John D'Andrea
Tracks 1 to 5, engineered by Dan Nebenzal
Tracks 1 to 5, assisted by Keith Heffner
Tracks 1 to 5, mixed by Dan Nebenzal and Michael Lloyd
Tracks 1 to 5, recording musical instruments: Don Griffin/West LA Music
Tracks 1 to 5, production coordination: Debbie Lytton
Tracks 6 to 10, produced by Bobby Vinton and Tom Kubis
Tracks 6 to 10, arranged by Tom Kubis
Tracks 6 to 10, engineered and mixed by Hill Swimmer
Art direction/design: Neuman, Walker & Associates
Liner notes by Don Ovens

Bobby Vinton albums
1990 Christmas albums
Christmas albums by American artists
Pop Christmas albums
Curb Records albums
Albums produced by Michael Lloyd (music producer)